The Wardak or Wardag are a tribe of the Pashtun people. That mainly live in the Wardak Province of Afghanistan. They migrated to the Wardak province in around 1730. Although they are mainly found in Afghanistan, they can also be found in Peshawar, Attock and Dir in Khyber Pakhtunkhwa province of Pakistan.

Wardak, Mangals, Musazai, and Hani, are first brother Orakzais and the Dilazak tribes are Wardaks Step brothers

Wardak Subtribes 
Just like other Pashtun tribes, Wardak tribe is divided into its own individual subtribes and clans

 Nuri
 Mirkhel
 Mayar

External links
 Wardag or Wardak tribe
Program for Culture and Conflict Studies.  Katani.  US Naval Postgraduate School.  Last updated 23 January 2009.

Pashtun tribes
Ethnic groups in Maidan Wardak Province